English singer, songwriter, multi-instrumentalist, and record producer James Blake has released 5 studio albums, 6 extended plays, 28 singles and 13 music videos.

Studio albums

Extended plays

Singles

As lead artist

As featured artist

Other charted songs

Guest appearances

as Harmonimix
2012: "Confidence Boost" – Harmonimix and Trimbal

Remixes

Production credits

Music videos

as Harmonimix

Notes

References

External links

Discographies of British artists